Manuel 'Manu' Sarabia López (born 9 January 1957) is a Spanish retired professional footballer who played as a striker.

He amassed La Liga totals of 363 games and 101 goals over the course of 14 seasons, mainly with Athletic Bilbao but also with Logroñés. He won four major titles with the former, notably two national championships, and scored 182 times all competitions comprised.

Left-footed, Sarabia represented Spain at Euro 1984.

Club career
Born in Abanto y Ciérbana-Abanto Zierbena, Biscay, Sarabia came through the ranks of Lezama, Athletic Bilbao's prolific youth system, making his debut for the main squad on 19 September 1976 in a 1–1 home draw against CD Málaga. He was particularly determined to succeed at the club after his elder brother was rejected due to his birthplace in Torres, Jaén (despite spending most of his life in Biscay), as this did not fit the criteria for Athletic's signing policy at the time.

A full first-team member from 1978–79 onwards, having also served a loan with neighbours Barakaldo CF in the previous year, Sarabia went on to appear in 284 La Liga matches for the Basques (with 83 goals). He had a best output of 16 in the 1982–83 season when Athletic won the league title, renewing it the following campaign).

Sarabia retired aged 34 in 1991, after three seasons with modest CD Logroñés also in the top division, scoring more than 20 official goals during his stint. He took up coaching three years later, having very brief stints in the second level – the only season he started and finished, with Bilbao Athletic, ended in relegation.

International career
Sarabia played 15 times with Spain in a two-year span, scoring twice. His first goal was one of 12 in the nation's routing of Malta in a UEFA Euro 1984 qualifier, in Seville.

Sarabia subsequently appeared in the tournament's final stage in France, having three substitute appearances for the runners-up.

Personal life
Sarabia's son, Eder, was also a footballer, albeit only in the amateur level, before becoming a coach with youth teams such as Danok Bat CF and serving as assistant to Quique Setién (former teammate of his father) at FC Barcelona.

Career statistics
Scores and results list Spain's goal tally first, score column indicates score after each Sarabia goal.

Honours
Athletic Bilbao
La Liga: 1982–83, 1983–84
Copa del Rey: 1983–84; runner-up 1976–77, 1984–85
Supercopa de España: 1984 (Athletic Bilbao were awarded the trophy as winners of the double)
UEFA Cup: runner-up 1976–77

Spain
UEFA European Championship: runner-up 1984

References

External links

1957 births
Living people
People from Abanto y Ciérbana-Abanto Zierbena
Spanish footballers
Footballers from the Basque Country (autonomous community)
Association football forwards
La Liga players
Segunda División players
Bilbao Athletic footballers
Athletic Bilbao footballers
Barakaldo CF footballers
CD Logroñés footballers
Spain under-21 international footballers
Spain amateur international footballers
Spain international footballers
UEFA Euro 1984 players
Spanish football managers
Segunda División managers
Segunda División B managers
Athletic Bilbao B managers
CD Badajoz managers
CD Numancia managers
Athletic Bilbao non-playing staff
Basque Country international footballers
Sportspeople from Biscay